Eder Pacheco Ferreira (born 23 July 1977 in Dois Vizinhos) is a Brazilian professional footballer who plays as a striker who last played for Tepic in the Ascenso MX. He is a Mexican naturalized citizen.

Club career
Pacheco is a naturalized Mexican who has played most of his professional career in the Ascenso MX in Mexico.

Honors

Club
León
Ascenso MX: Clausura 2012

Individual
Ascenso MX Top Scorer: Apertura 2010

References

1977 births
Living people
Brazilian footballers
Mexican footballers
Naturalized citizens of Mexico
Association football forwards
Atlético Morelia players
Club Puebla players
C.D. Veracruz footballers
Club León footballers
Correcaminos UAT footballers
Liga MX players
Brazilian expatriate footballers
Expatriate footballers in Mexico
Brazilian emigrants to Mexico
Sportspeople from Paraná (state)